L. V. Jefferson (born Louis Victor Jefferson) was an American screenwriter and short story author. He claimed to be capable of automatic writing and was an influence on Jane Wolfe. He credited looking into a crystal ball with empowering him. He was born in Carthage, Missouri. He worked in the Western scenario department for Universal. He also wrote for Triangle and worked with Irvin Willat of Willat Studios.

Filmography 

 The Grail (1915)
 The Making of Maddalena (1916) from a play by Samuel Service and Mary Service
 The House of Lies (1916), co-writer
 Her Father's Son (1916), co-writer
 Redeeming Love (1916), story
 The House with the Golden Windows (1916)
 Out of the Wreck (1917), story
 The Sawdust Ring (1917)
 A Square Deal (1917)
 Ten of Diamonds (1917), from a story by Albert Cowles
 Put Up Your Hands (1919)
 Charge It to Me (1919)
 The Kentucky Colonel (1920)
 Riders of the Dawn (1920), co-writer of adaptation from a Zane Grey novel
 The Desert Scorpion (1920), story
 Crossing Trails (1921)
 The Face of the World (1921)
 Partners of the Tide (1921)
 Daring Danger (1922)
 Tracks (1922)
 The Redeeming Sin (1925), based on Jefferson's short story
 The Cloud Rider (1925)
 The Primtose Path (1925)
 Flying High (1926)
 The Set-Up (1926)
 The Escape (1926)
 Three Pals (1926)
 The Flag: A Story Inspired by the Tradition of Betsy Ross (1927)
 Temptations of a Shop Girl (1927)
 One Chance in a Million (1927)
 The Haunted Homestead (1927)
 Catch as Catch Can (1927)
 Born to Battle (1927)
 Laddie Be Good (1928), co-writer
 A Gentleman Preferred (1928), co-writer
 China Slaver (1929), co-writer from a story by Calvin Holivey and Rupert Hughes
 Pueblo Terror (1931)
 Trails of the Golden West (1931)
 His Debt (1919), story
 Lightning Range (1933)
 The Fighting Cowboy (1933)
 The Pecos Dandy (1934)
 Twisted Rails (1934), story author and screenplay co-writer
 The Test (1935), continuity and dialogue
 $20 a Week (1935)
 The Lion's Den (1936)

References

External links 
 

1873 births
1959 deaths
People from Carthage, Missouri
20th-century American screenwriters
20th-century American short story writers
Screenwriters from Missouri